The 2002 New Hampshire Wildcats football team was an American football team that represented the University of New Hampshire as a member of the Atlantic 10 Conference during the 2002 NCAA Division I-AA football season. In its fourth year under head coach Sean McDonnell, the team compiled a 3–8 record (2–7 against conference opponents) and finished tenth out of eleven teams in the Atlantic 10 Conference.

Schedule

References

New Hampshire
New Hampshire Wildcats football seasons
New Hampshire Wildcats football